Viktor Naslund (born July 1, 1992) is a Swedish professional ice hockey player who currently plays for HV71 in the Swedish Elitserien.

References

External links

1992 births
Living people
HV71 players
Swedish ice hockey defencemen
Sportspeople from Jönköping